Carlos Goez (December 13, 1939 – December 25, 1990) founded the original Pomander Book Shop, (along with his life partner Timothy Mawson), "a rather unprepossessing, Dickensian storefront"  The "Pomander," as it was known, was located at 252 West 95th Street, on Manhattan's Upper West Side, next to the Thalia, one of New York's first repertory movie theatres.   Hidden down the same street was the historic architectural gem Pomander Walk where Goez resided for many years.

A native of the nation of Colombia and educated at Columbia University, Goez opened the Pomander Book Shop in 1975.  He sold second-hand, fine, and rare volumes in impeccable condition, sponsored readings, as well as mended and cleaned old books. His standards were exacting, as was his English, and he did not hesitate to tell customers what they must buy or "offer trenchant commentary on politics and the passing scene."  His tiny store attracted a large following, counting among its patrons writers and bibliophiles such as Eric Bentley, Susan Sontag, Adrienne Rich, Robert Payne, and journalist William L. Hamilton.  Somewhat to Goez's chagrin, the Pomander became a popular resource for film and theatre set dressers, who would describe their characters and settings to Goez, so that he could compile visually appropriate book collections for their sets.  The tiny bookstore was a "kind of Upper West Side salon that drew literary giants, earnest scholars, and neighborhood eccentrics."
In 1986 Carlos Goez sold Pomander to Suzanne Ostro, who was forced to relocate the shop further uptown where it thrived until she closed the bookstore itself at the end of the 1990s and began operating it as a private bookseller, Pomander Books, out of her apartment, specializing in modern poetry. Goez died in 1990.

References 

Antiquarian booksellers
1939 births
1990 deaths
Colombian emigrants to the United States
Columbia University alumni
People from Medellín
People from Manhattan
American booksellers